RF3 can refer to:

 Red Faction: Guerrilla, the third installment of the Red Faction franchise
 RF3, a candidate phylum of bacteria